The de Havilland Goblin, originally designated as the Halford H-1, is an early turbojet engine designed by Frank Halford and built by de Havilland. The Goblin was the second British jet engine to fly, after Whittle's Power Jets W.1, and the first to pass a type test and receive a type certificate issued for an aircraft propulsion turbine.

Although it was conceived in 1941 it remained unchanged in basic form for 13 years by which time it had evolved to the Mk. 35 export version.

The Goblin was the primary engine of the de Havilland Vampire, and was to have been the engine for the F-80 Shooting Star (as the Allis-Chalmers J36) before that design switched engines due to production delays at Allis-Chalmers. The Goblin also powered the Saab 21R fighter, Fiat G.80 trainer and the de Havilland DH 108 "Swallow" experimental aircraft. The Goblin was later scaled up as the larger de Havilland Ghost, with the model numbers continuing from the last marks of the Goblin.

Design and development

Design of the engine was carried out by Frank Halford at his London consulting firm starting in April 1941. It was based on the overall design pattern pioneered by Frank Whittle, using a centrifugal compressor providing compressed air to sixteen individual combustion chambers, from which the exhaust powered a single-stage axial turbine.

Compared to Whittle designs, the H-1 was cleaned up in that it used a single-sided compressor with the inlet at the front, and a straight-through layout with the combustion chambers exhausting straight onto the turbine. Whittle's designs such as the Power Jets W.2 used a reverse-flow layout that piped the hot air back to the middle of the engine, in order to "fold" it and reduce its length. The straight-through design simplified the engine, at the expense of being slightly longer and requiring a longer power shaft between the turbine and compressor. Although it eliminated the Whittle-style "folding", the Goblin was still a compact design.

The H-1 first ran on 13 April 1942 and quickly matured to produce its full design thrust within two months. It first flew on 5 March 1943 in the Gloster Meteor, and on 26 September in the de Havilland Vampire.  It was around this time that de Havilland purchased Halford's company and set him up as the chairman of the de Havilland Engine Company, with the engine name changing from H-1 to "Goblin", while the new H-2 design became the "Ghost" – de Havilland jet and rocket engines were all named after spectral apparitions.

In July 1943, one of the two H-1s then available (actually the spare engine intended as a backup for the one installed in the Vampire prototype) was sent to the United States, where it was selected to become the primary engine of the Lockheed P-80 Shooting Star. This engine was fitted to the prototype P-80, which first flew on 9 January 1944. The engine was later accidentally destroyed in ground testing, and was replaced by the only remaining H-1 from the prototype Vampire. Allis-Chalmers was selected to produce the engine in the US as the J36, but ran into lengthy delays. Instead, the Allison J33, developed by General Electric as the I-40 (their greatly improved  version of the J31, itself based on Whittle's W.1), was selected for the production P-80A.

Variants

 H.1/Goblin I
Developed about 2,300 lbf (10.2 kN) thrust (nominal thrust for prototype) and 2,700 lbf (12.0 kN) for production models.
 Goblin II (DGn.2)
3,100 lbf (13.8 kN)
 Goblin 3 (DGn.3)
3,350 lbf (14.9 kN)
 Goblin 35
3,500 lbf (15.6 kN)
 Goblin 4 (DGn.4)
3,750 lbf (16.7 kN)
 Allis-Chalmers J36
Licence production in the United States by Allis-Chalmers.
Svenska Flygmotor RM1Goblin II production in Sweden
Svenska Flygmotor RM1AGoblin III production in Sweden

Applications

Aircraft applications

 Curtiss XF15C-1
 de Havilland DH 108 Swallow
 de Havilland Vampire
 Fiat G.80
 Gloster Meteor
 Lockheed XP-80 Shooting Star
 Saab 21R

Alternative applications
 Bluebird K4

Engines on display

Goblin engines are preserved and on display at several museums including:
 Brooklands Museum
 South Yorkshire Aircraft Museum
 Canadian Warplane Heritage Museum
 de Havilland Aircraft Museum
 Midland Air Museum
 Royal Air Force Museum Cosford
 Shuttleworth Collection
 Vintage Flying Museum
 Queensland Air Museum, Caloundra, Australia
 A part-sectioned engine is on display at Historical Aircraft Restoration Society at Albion Park, New South Wales, Australia
 Technical University of Madrid
 University of Hertfordshire - De Havilland Campus

Survivors
As of June 2011, two Goblin-powered de Havilland Vampires remain airworthy on the British register.

As of December 2014, three Goblin-powered de Havilland Vampires remain airworthy in North America.  N115DH is owned by the World Heritage Air Museum., C-FJRH is operated under the Jet Aircraft Museum in Ontario, Canada. and N593RH is owned by Vampire Aviation LLC.

As of November 2015, three Goblin-powered de Havilland Vampires remain airworthy in South Africa.  Serial number 276 and 277 are in the SA Air Force Museum and the third is at Wonderboom Airport.

Specifications (D.H Goblin II D.Gn 27)

See also

References

Notes

Bibliography

Gunston, Bill. World Encyclopedia of Aero Engines. Cambridge, England. Patrick Stephens Limited, 1989. 
Smith, Geoffrey G.Gas Turbines and Jet Propulsion for Aircraft, London S.E.1, Flight Publishing Co.Ltd., 1946.

External links

 DH Goblin at EnginesUK
 "De Havilland Goblin" a 1945 Flight article
 "Series II Goblin" a 1946 Flight article
 "Development of the Goblin Engine" a 1947 Flight article
 "Maintenance At A Minimum – D.H. Goblin Completes a Second 500-Hour Test Run" – a 1949 Flight news item

Goblin
1940s turbojet engines
Centrifugal-flow turbojet engines